The 1935 Lehigh Engineers football team was an American football team that represented Lehigh University during the 1935 college football season. In its second season under head coach Glen Harmeson, the team improved to a 5–4 record, though it again split the two games against its Middle Three Conference rivals.  

The team played its home games at Taylor Stadium in Bethlehem, Pennsylvania.

Schedule

References

Lehigh
Lehigh Mountain Hawks football seasons
Lehigh Engineers football